Parsa Marvi (born 6 February 1982) is a German politician of the Social Democratic Party (SPD) who has been serving as a member of the Bundestag since 2021.

Early life and career
Marvi was born 1982 in the Iranian city of Teheran and became German cititzen in 2020. 

Marvi worked at MLP (2006–2011) and 1&1 Telecommunication (2011–2021).

Political career
Marvi became a member of the Bundestag in the 2021 elections, representing the Karlsruhe-Stadt district. In parliament, he has since been serving on the Finance Committee and the Committee on Digital Affairs.

Other activities
 Sparkasse Karlsruhe, Member of the Supervisory Board (–2021)
 German United Services Trade Union (ver.di), Member

References 

Living people
1982 births
Social Democratic Party of Germany politicians
21st-century German politicians
Members of the Bundestag 2021–2025
People from Tehran
Naturalized citizens of Germany

German politicians of Iranian descent